Gail Levin (June 20, 1946 in Chicago – 31 July 2013 in The Bronx) was a documentary filmmaker best known for her work with the PBS series American Masters. She died 31 July 2013 in the Bronx at the age of 67 from breast cancer.

References

External links
 

1946 births
2013 deaths
American documentary film directors
American documentary film producers
People from Chicago